Neopolyptychus convexus is a moth of the family Sphingidae. It is known from Brachystegia woodland in the Democratic Republic of the Congo, Zambia and western Tanzania.

The wingspan is 28–34 mm for males and 34–44 mm for females.

References

Neopolyptychus
Moths described in 1903
Insects of the Democratic Republic of the Congo
Moths of Africa
Fauna of Gabon
Insects of Tanzania
Fauna of Zambia